Kamičak may refer to:

 Kamičak, a village in the municipality of Ključ, Bosnia and Herzegovina
 Kamičak Castle, a ruined medieval fortified residential structure in Krka National Park, Croatia
 Kamičak Fortress, a fortified structure in Sinj, Split-Dalmatia County, Croatia
 Kamičak Fortress (Ključ), a fortified structure near Ključ, Una-Sana Canton, Bosnia and Herzegovina